Cyprian Bhekuzulu Nyangayezizwe kaSolomon (4 August 1924 – 17 September 1968) was the king of the Zulu nation from 1948 until his death at Nongoma in 1968. He succeeded his father, king Solomon kaDinuzulu, after a lengthy succession dispute which was only resolved in 1944. His uncle, Arthur Mshiyeni kaDinuzulu, functioned as regent during the succession dispute and Cyprian's minority.

Cyprian ascended the throne as a chief of uSuthu and never as a Paramount Chief until 1951 when he was recognised as such by the white minority government of South Africa. Even then, he was a social head with no real power. Not since 1879 has anyone been recognised as a head of the Zulu people with an exception of Cyprian's uncle (acting Paramount Chief Mshiyeni) but even he was a regent. This title was granted to him because the government wanted to secure a Bantustan and not out of genuine care for the man or the Zulu people.

Early years 
Cyprian had an upbringing similar to those of other children in the Zulu Kingdom, herding cattle with his siblings and cousins, and one of those cousins was Mangosuthu Buthelezi who later became one of the prominent politicians in South Africa and Prime Minister to King Zwelithini (Cyprian's son and successor). Cyprian's father Solomon died in 1933 and there was no heir to immediately succeed him because of the princes’ minority, this led to Solomon's full brother, Arthur Edward Mshiyeni, being appointed the regent.

Succession and disputes 
The late king, Solomon, did not appoint an heir and as a result a candidate had to be nominated once the princes reached maturity.  The first of these candidates was Solomon's eldest son, Victor Phikokwaziyo but there was a lot of dispute within the royal family on his candidature. Another candidate was Thandayiphi Absalom, the prince regent preferred candidate. His nomination, however, brought discontent amongst the Zulu people as the prince regent and the nominee were perceived as being too accommodating to the Apartheid regime.  
It is this growing unpopularity of the two princes that resulted in a legend that a true and rightful heir is yet to avail himself and consequently fueled Cyprian's ambition to inherit the throne. A while back, there was a primary school book of which the writer names Cyprian as the heir. Although the copies were abruptly modified and the claim removed, it did leave Cyprian with a confidence that he was “nominated by the books” and he pursued this claim. The momentum built around the prince and within a few months he had enough following to make the government reconsider Thandayiphi's candidacy.  An inquiry was made into the succession issue by the government and in the end, Cyprian was accepted as the heir. His mother had managed to provide a signed letter by the late Chief stating that Cyprian is his heir; the letter was verified to be authentic by the technical experts.

Death 
Cyprian was succeeded by his son, king Goodwill Zwelethini kaBhekuzulu (d. 2021) and his daughter Princess Nomusa kaBhekuzulu (d. 2020) was Regent Queen to AmaRharhabe (sub-group of Xhosa) as Queen Noloyiso after the death of husband King Maxhob'ayakhawuleza Sandile in 2011.

See also
 List of Zulu kings

References

1924 births
1968 deaths
Zulu kings